Acestrorhynchus britskii is a species of fish in the family Acestrorhynchidae. It was described by Naércio Aquino de Menezes in 1969. It inhabits the São Francisco river in Brazil.

The fish is named in honor of ichthyologist Heraldo A. Britski with the Departamento de Zoologia, Secretaria de Agricultura, in São Paulo, Brazil, who collected the type specimen.

References

Acestrorhynchidae
Fish of the São Francisco River basin
Taxa named by Naércio Aquino de Menezes
Fish described in 1969